Ballingham railway station is a disused stone built railway station that served the villages of Ballingham and Carey in Herefordshire on the Hereford, Ross and Gloucester Railway. It was situated between Ballingham Railway Bridge and Ballingham Tunnel, two of the most substantial structures on the Great Western Railway line which linked Ross-on-Wye and Hereford. Originally proposed by the owner of Ballingham Court the station had a limited service and was never well used. It closed, along with the line, on 2 November 1964.

The station building has been extended and is now a private house. The platform is still in existence.

References

Further reading

External links
Station site today
Ballingham on a navigable 1946 O. S. map

Former Great Western Railway stations
Disused railway stations in Herefordshire
Railway stations in Great Britain opened in 1908
Railway stations in Great Britain closed in 1964
Beeching closures in England
1908 establishments in England